Wang Phikun is a sub-district in the Wang Thong District of Phitsanulok Province, Thailand.

Geography
Wang Phikun lies in the Nan Basin, which is part of the Chao Phraya Watershed. The Wang Thong River flows through Wang Phikun.

Administration
The following is a list of the sub-district's muban, which roughly correspond to villages:

Temples
The following is a list of Buddhist temples in the Wang Phikun Sub-district:
วัดดงข่อย in muban 3
วัดคลองเป็ด (เหนือ) in muban 4
วัดคลองเมือง in muban 4
วัดคลองเป็ด (ใต้) in muban 6
วัดทางลัดประชาราม in muban 5
วัดดงพลวง in muban 10 
วัดดงจันทร์ in muban 11 
วัดวังสำโรง in muban 8 
วัดวังพิกุลวนาราม in muban 2
วัดวังประดู่ in muban 1
วัดวังวารีศรีศรัทธาราม in muban 7

References

Tambon of Phitsanulok province
Populated places in Phitsanulok province